The Russian Orthodox church in Tunis, also called  'Church of the Resurrection'  is a church Orthodox of the city of Tunis (Tunisia).

Located on the Avenue Mohammed V, it was built by the  Russian community of Tunis.

The laying of the foundation stone in October 1953. Built by Russian architect Michel Kozmin (1901-1999), it was inaugurated on June 10, 1956.

Notes et references 

Churches in Tunisia
Religious buildings and structures in Tunis
1956 establishments in Tunisia
Russian diaspora in Africa
Churches completed in 1956
Russian Orthodox church buildings